Trevor "T. J." Graham Jr. (born July 27, 1989) is a former American football wide receiver. He was drafted by the Buffalo Bills in the third round of the 2012 NFL Draft. He played college football at North Carolina State.

High school career
Graham attended Wakefield High School in Raleigh, North Carolina. He caught seven passes for 100 yards and two touchdowns his senior season and had two kickoff returns for 109 yards. Rated as a two-star recruit by Rivals.com, his only offer came from North Carolina State, which he accepted.

College career
During his four-year tenure at NC State, he finished as the ACC career leader in kickoff return yards with 3,153. He also accumulated 99 receptions for 1,453 receiving yards and 16 total touchdowns (12 receiving, 2 kick return TD's and 2 punt return TD's).

Graham was also a track athlete. He finished third nationally in the 100-meter dash at the Nike Nationals in 2007, he was the 2008 4A state champion in the 100 and 200 meters, posting times of 10.44 seconds and 20.82 seconds, respectively. He recorded personal bests of 10.21 seconds in the 100 meters and 20.79 seconds in the 200 meters.

Professional career

Buffalo Bills
Graham was drafted by the Buffalo Bills in the third round (69th overall) of the 2012 NFL Draft. On July 9, 2012, he signed a four-year with the Bills. In his rookie season, he caught his first career touchdown reception from Ryan Fitzpatrick in a 24–14 win over the Cleveland Browns. He was released by the Bills on August 30, 2014.

Tennessee Titans
On August 31, 2014, Graham was claimed off waivers by the Tennessee Titans. He was waived on September 23, 2014.

New York Jets
Graham signed with the New York Jets on September 29, 2014. On August 29, 2015, Graham was released.

New Orleans Saints
On October 20, 2015, Graham signed with the New Orleans Saints. On October 24, he was waived by the Saints. On October 28, 2015, Graham was re-signed by the Saints. He was waived again on October 30, 2015 to make room for linebacker Jo-Lonn Dunbar. He re-signed with the Saints again on November 3, 2015.  He was waived once again by the Saints on December 23, to make room for Travaris Cadet.

Philadelphia Eagles
Graham signed a one-year contract with the Philadelphia Eagles on April 22, 2016, following a mini-camp tryout. On August 21, 2016, Graham was released by the Eagles.

Montreal Alouettes
On May 11, 2017, Graham signed with the Montreal Alouettes of the Canadian Football League.

Carolina Panthers
On July 24, 2017, Graham signed with the Carolina Panthers. He was released on September 1, 2017.

Montreal Alouettes (second stint)
On October 23, 2017, Graham signed with the Montreal Alouettes of the Canadian Football League. He was released by the Montreal Alouettes on August 21, 2018. He was then resigned to the practice squad.

Coaching career
On May 11, 2022, Graham was announced as a member of the Green Bay Packers Bill Walsh Diversity Coaching Fellowship program.

References

External links
 
 Buffalo Bills bio
 NC State Wolfpack bio

1989 births
Living people
Sportspeople from Raleigh, North Carolina
Players of American football from Raleigh, North Carolina
American football wide receivers
American football return specialists
NC State Wolfpack football players
Buffalo Bills players
Tennessee Titans players
New York Jets players
New Orleans Saints players
Philadelphia Eagles players
Carolina Panthers players
Montreal Alouettes players
Canadian football wide receivers